René Repasi (born 8 November 1979) is a German politician from Social Democratic Party of Germany. He has been a Member of the European Parliament since 2022.

References

See also 

 List of members of the European Parliament for Germany, 2019–2024

1979 births
Living people
21st-century German politicians
Social Democratic Party of Germany MEPs
MEPs for Germany 2019–2024
Heidelberg University alumni
German people of Hungarian descent
Politicians from Karlsruhe
Academic staff of Erasmus University Rotterdam